The 1920 Rice Owls football team was an American football team that represented Rice University as a member of the Southwest Conference (SWC) during the 1920 college football season. In its eighth season under head coach Philip Arbuckle, the team compiled a 4–2–2 record (2–2–1 against SWC opponents), and outscored opponents by a total of 105 to 28.

Schedule

References

Rice
Rice Owls football seasons
Rice Owls football